Muslim Urban Professionals (Muppies) is the largest organization of professional Muslims in the world. It has chapters in Atlanta, Boston, New York City, Dallas, San Francisco, Seattle, Chicago, Washington DC, Houston, Los Angeles, London, Toronto, and Dubai.

Muppies is an organization dedicated to the advancement of Muslim professionals and is built on the foundation of professional success and community engagement. Members gain access to job postings and networking events, while also partaking in conversations relating to society at large and Islam in the modern workplace. 

Muppies helps Muslim professionals on leadership tracks in business, entrepreneurship, nonprofit, and government. This network consists of many Muslims on similar paths who offer practical advice for other Muslims to make the most of their careers because, while strong skills and hard work are key determinants of career advancement, networking and mentorship are key stepping stones. 

This invaluable support network provides career advice, job-search support, and professional insight. Muppies offers: 

 Access to selective job opportunities 
 A global network of talented + enthusiastic professionals 
 A global listserv + member database 
 Exclusive admissions resources for selective schools 
 Opportunities to mentor college school students 
 Career development webinars + professional events around the globe

Mission

Muppies' mission statement is "a global nonprofit organization dedicated to empowering and advancing Muslim professionals to be leaders in their careers and communities" Its platform is supported by the following five pillars:

 A membership base of Muslim professionals from the fields of consulting, finance, corporate development, entrepreneurship, government, non-profit and other related & similar fields
 Social-networking and mentorship opportunities
 Access to a premiere list of global job postings
 Career and future-trends forums with industry leaders
 Civic engagement within broader society

Vision
Muppies envisions a global community of professionals that supports the advancement of Muslim leaders in the public, private, and nonprofit sectors.

Values
Muppies' desire is to live in a society that understands, respects, and includes Muslims in mainstream culture, and we aid in efforts that improve the representation and inclusion of Muslims. 

COMMITMENT TO DIVERSITY & INCLUSION 

Muppies embraces the inclusion of all voices across membership, staff, Executive Committee, event speakers, and guests, regardless of race, ethnicity, ability, class, religion, age, gender identity, sexual orientation, or any other differentiating characteristic. Muppies’ leaders and team members are dedicated to creating programs and opportunities that elevate underrepresented voices.  

Muppies strives to create environments in which any individual or group is welcomed, respected, supported, and valued within the Muppies community. An inclusive and welcoming climate acknowledges historical barriers to full participation, embraces differences and offers respect. These values are demonstrated through words, actions, and thoughts of all community members and Muppies’ leadership.  

Diversity at Muppies is:  

Committed to representation that reflects the wider elements of human difference in society with a focus on five key diversity indicators: race and ethnicity, gender, age, geographical location, and religious sect within Islam, while recognizing a broader understanding of the wide psychological, socioeconomic, and physical differences that occur among individuals.  

Inclusion at Muppies is:  

The act of creating environments in which any individual or group can be and feel welcomed, respected, supported, and valued within the Muppies community. An inclusive and welcoming climate acknowledges historical barriers to full participation, embraces differences and offers respect. These values are demonstrated through words, actions, and thoughts of all community members and Muppies’ leadership.

Programs
Muppies Annual Conference (MAC)  

The Muppies Annual Conference is the world’s premier professional conference for Muslims. MAC is an opportunity to reunite individual Muppies members with the global organization. By sharing professional and leadership tools, techniques, and stories, members return to their respective cities with renewed motivation to achieve their leadership goals at work and in their communities.  

Muppies Webinar Series  

The Muppies Webinar Series showcases the talent and expertise within Muppies’ global network. In this series, speakers share industry best practices and soft skills exclusively to Muppies members. 

Muppies Leadership Summit  

The Muppies Leadership Summit (MLS) is Muppies’ annual meeting of local and global executive leaders. Aligned with our mission to empower and advance Muslim professionals to be leaders in their careers and communities, the goal for this weekend-long leadership program is to develop talent within local and global leaders so that they are empowered with tools to succeed in leading within Muppies and leading in their communities outside of Muppies. Each MLS has in-person leadership development talks, strategic planning breakout sessions, roundtables, and social opportunities that allow team members from across the globe to network with one another in person. 

Muppies’ Young Professionals Programming 

SUMMER INTERNSHIP PROGRAM  

Since 2013, Muppies' Summer Internship Program has helped connect students with professionals across the United States and abroad. Every year, events welcome Muslim undergraduate interns to the Muppies organization and its network and offerings in major cities across the U.S. 

MUPPIES INVESTMENT BANKING PROGRAM  

This program prepares college juniors for the investment banking internship recruiting process by connecting qualified students with mentors working at top tier investment banks. The program is held annually in the Fall, and applications go live at the end of August.  

MUPPIES CONSULTING PROGRAM  

This program provides high-potential college seniors with a series of webinars related to the consulting recruiting process as well as dedicated mentors at top-tier consulting firms. The program is held annually in the Fall and applications go live at the end of August.

History
Since 2006, Muppies members have strived to empower and advance Muslim professionals in their careers and communities by offering professional development opportunities, networking opportunities, and in-person and online support. 

Today, Muppies has scaled to a global 501c3 charitable organization with over 2,900 members in 33 countries, and 11 active committees across the globe. Over the years, Muppies has added admissions counseling, mentorship programs, and professional development webinars and events to better serve a growing number of constituents.

Media Coverage
The New York Times profiled Muppies and several of its members on August 14, 2012 in an article title "Muslims on Wall Street, Bridging Two Traditions. " UAE based newspaper The National (Abu Dhabi) also profiled the organization in its January 16, 2010 feature "When Faith and Profession Mix."

Past Events

See also

American Muslim Council
Council on American-Islamic Relations
Canadian Council on American-Islamic Relations
Muslim Public Affairs Council
Muslim American Society

References

External links

Islamic organizations based in the United States
Civic and political organizations of the United States
Non-profit organizations based in New York City